Spente le Stelle: Opera Trance & Emma Shapplin The Remixes Part One is a mini remix album by Opera Trance of the Emma Shapplin songs, Spente le Stelle and Cuor Senza Sangue. Both songs are from Shapplin's debut album, Carmine Meo. The Cuor Senza Sangue remix is sung by Chiara Zeffirelli, who featured as the leading soprano of Atylantos.

Spente le Stelle [Yomanda Radio Edit] - Emma Shapplin
Spente le Stelle [Yomanda Remix] - Emma Shapplin
Cuor Senza Sangue [Odji de C. Mix] - Chiara Zeffirelli
Spente le Stelle [Yomanda Dub] - Emma Shapplin
Cuor Senza Sangue [Odji de C. Instrumental] - Chiara Zeffirelli

The Spanish version of Cuor Senza Sangue remix (Cuerpo sin Alma), performed by Emma Shapplin, is found in her single Discovering Yourself.

References

http://www.discogs.com/Opera-Trance-Spente-Le-Stelle-The-Remixes-Part-One/release/504986

External links 
 Official Site

Emma Shapplin albums
2000 remix albums